The women's shot put event  at the 1993 IAAF World Indoor Championships was held on 14 March.

Results

References

Shot
Shot put at the World Athletics Indoor Championships
1993 in women's athletics